Hate Culture is the debut studio album by William Control. It was released on October 28, 2008 through independent label Victory Records.

Recording and composition
The album was written, produced and engineered by William Control. It was mixed by Justin Armstrong and William Control at Robert Lang Studios in Seattle in July 2008.

The album is a concept album that follows a man named William Control on the last day before he kills himself. Speaking to Kerrang! in 2009, Francis said:That came out of some serious desperation and hopelessness. Being on the road for five years had worn me down. I’d literally been home for three months in those five years and there were internal problems within Aiden that, coupled with some things that were going in my personal life, meant I snapped and had a breakdown. I went home and wrote some songs that didn’t really fit Aiden. We’re a punk rock band who like horror films…and those were more electronic and dark. I showed them to the label and they liked them so I put together William Control as a solo project and that album came together pretty quickly as a therapeutic outlet.

Release
The single "Beautiful Loser" was released on iTunes on September 30, 2008. On November 4, a music video directed by Kevin McVey was released. In February and March 2009, the band supported Escape the Fate on their headlining tour in the U.S.

Track listing 

Notes
 Prologue is from the opening monologue The Libertine, by Stephen Jeffreys.
 A track from the album sessions, Deathclub, was remixed by Wes Borland and Renholdër and included on the Underworld: Rise of the Lycans: Original Motion Picture Soundtrack.

Personnel 
All credits adapted from liner notes.
 Justin Armstrong – mixing
 Brit Asema – additional backing vocals 
 Juliana Bricknell – voice 
 William Control – producer, engineer, mixing
 DoubleJ – artwork, layout
 Kenneth Fletcher – assistant engineer
 Jake Gravbot – styling
 Lisa Johnson – photography
 Shannie Xavier Yngvason – additional backing vocals

References

2008 debut albums
William Control albums
Victory Records albums
Concept albums
Albums recorded at Robert Lang Studios